Pierre Léonard Vander Linden (12 December 1797 – 5 April 1831) was a Belgian entomologist.

Works 
He was the author of Observations sur les Hyménoptères d’Europe de la famille des Fouisseurs (1827–1829).

 P.L. Vander Linden (1829) Essai sur les insects de Java et des îles voisines. Nouveaux mémoires de l'Académie Royale des Sciences et Belles-Lettres de Bruxelles, Volume 5, page 1-28

1797 births
1831 deaths
Belgian entomologists